PQQ may refer to:

 Pyrroloquinoline quinone, enzyme cofactor
 Port Macquarie Airport, IATA Airport Code
 Pre-qualification questionnaire, which precedes an invitation to tender

See also
 PQ2 (disambiguation)